Taylor Building may refer to:

Taylor Building (Little Rock, Arkansas), listed on the NRHP in Arkansas
Taylor Carpet Company Building, Indianapolis, IN, listed on the NRHP in Indiana
Wenzil Taylor Building, Spillville, IA, listed on the NRHP in Iowa
Lucy Hobbs Taylor Building, Lawrence, KS, listed on the NRHP in Kansas
Wright and Taylor Building, Louisville, KY, listed on the NRHP in Kentucky
Taylor-Olive Building, St. Louis, MO, listed on the NRHP in Missouri
Taylor Building (Arlington, Virginia), a building